The 2006 AFL Grand Final was an Australian rules football game contested between the Sydney Swans and West Coast Eagles, held at the Melbourne Cricket Ground in Melbourne on 30 September 2006. It was the 110th annual grand final of the Australian Football League (formerly the Victorian Football League), staged to determine the premiers for the 2006 AFL season. The match, attended by 97,431 spectators, was won by West Coast by a margin of one point, marking the club's third premiership victory.

Background

This was the second consecutive year that these two teams played in the premiership decider, with the Swans having won the 2005 AFL Grand Final by a margin of 4 points. At the conclusion of the home and away season, West Coast had finished first on the AFL ladder with 17 wins and 5 losses, winning the McClelland Trophy. Sydney had finished fourth with 14 wins and 8 losses.

In the week leading up to the grand final, Sydney's Adam Goodes was awarded the Brownlow Medal.

Pre-match entertainment
Prior to the match, at 10:00 a.m. the TAC Cup grand final was played.

The Red Berets parachuted into the MCG delivering the match balls, followed by a team warm up and the beginning of pre-match entertainment. The entertainment included a performance of the song "Flashdance (What A Feeling)", performed by Irene Cara,
 as well as appearances from Brian Mannix, John Paul Young, Daryl Braithwaite and Shane Howard (lead singer of Goanna). The medley of songs they performed included "Solid Rock", Yesterday's Hero", "The Horses", "Everybody Wants to Work" and "I Hear Motion".

Match summary

West Coast started the better, and outplayed the Swans in the first half and led by a convincing 25 points at half time. The Swans fought back in the third quarter and the margin was just 11 points at 3/4 time. Goodes goaled within the first 15 seconds of the last quarter and the margin was suddenly less than a kick. It was goal-for-goal in one of the most intense final quarters of modern grand final history, with West Coast hanging on by a single point to win its first premiership since 1994 and avenge its heartbreaking 4-point loss to the Swans in the previous year's grand final.

It was the fifth consecutive match between the two teams to be decided by less than a goal, and the first grand final to be decided by a point since St. Kilda edged out Collingwood in the 1966 VFL Grand Final (two other grand finals have been decided by a point, in 1899 and 1947). The match has been labelled as a 'classic'.

Grand Final Sprint
The Grand Final Sprint, which had heats ran before the pre-match entertainment and the final ran during the half-time break, was won by Carlton's Brendan Fevola. The 2006 Grand Final saw the first use of handicaps during the sprint.

Norm Smith Medal 

Andrew Embley was awarded the Norm Smith Medal for being judged the best player afield. He recorded 26 disposals, 6 marks, and 2 goals. Also polling votes were Brett Kirk (27 disposals and 9 tackles), Dean Cox (20 disposals and 34 hitouts), Daniel Kerr (20 disposals and 5 tackles), Tadhg Kennelly (21 disposals), and Beau Waters (26 disposals and 10 marks).

The voters and their choices were as follows:

Match scoring records
The 2006 grand final placed Sydney vs West Coast games further in the VFL/AFL record books for closeness, with the five most recent margins up to and including this game standing at 4, 4, 2, 1 and 1. With 12 points' total difference across five games, Sydney vs West Coast comprehensively beat the previous five-game record of 19 points, set by Hawthorn versus Collingwood in 1958–60. They also became the seventh pair of teams in VFL/AFL history (and the second in 2006 after Geelong vs Western Bulldogs) to contest two consecutive one-point games.

These records were further improved in the grand final rematch in Round 1, 2007, which was again decided by a single point, giving the pair the record for four games, five games and six games (5 points, 9 points and 13 points, respectively), and positioning them equal second for three games behind Brisbane vs Port Adelaide (2 points, 1997–98) and Hawthorn vs Footscray (3 points, 1956–57).

The 2006 grand final also marked the fourth time in VFL/AFL history that consecutive games between two teams were decided by the same total scores, with both the qualifying final and the grand final decided by 85–84. This previously occurred between South Melbourne vs Melbourne (1903–04), St Kilda vs Collingwood (1913–14) and Melbourne vs Richmond (1954–55). On none of the four occasions have the goals and behinds tallies been identical (Sydney outscored West Coast by 13.7 (85) – 12.12 (84) in the qualifying final, whilst West Coast pipped Sydney by 12.13 (85) – 12.12 (84) in 2006).

Scorecard

Post-match presentation
The post-match presentation was carried out by Craig Willis. The Jock McHale Medal was presented by former St. Kilda and Hawthorn Premiership coach Allan Jeans to the 2006 Premiership coach John Worsfold.  The Norm Smith Medal was presented by former Essendon player and 1984 winner Billy Duckworth to 2006 winner Andrew Embley. The premiership cup was presented by former West Coast Eagle two-time premiership player Glen Jakovich.

International telecasts
The following television networks covered the event.

 Papua New Guinea - EM TV, Australia Network (live)
 New Zealand - SKY Sport 1 (NZ) (live)
 South East Asia - Australia Network (live)
 Middle East - Australia Network.  Israel - Fox Sports Israel
 Indian subcontinent - Australia Network
 North America - United States - Setanta Sports North America (live), MHz Worldview (delayed).
 Canada - Fox Sports World Canada (live). See also Australian Football Association of North America.
 United Kingdom - British Sky Broadcasting (live)
 Ireland - TG4 (delayed)
 Spain - Canal+ Spain

Grand final week

Brownlow Medal

The 2006 Charles Brownlow Medal Presentation was held at the Palladium at Crown Casino, Melbourne on 25 September 2006. The Charles Brownlow Medal is awarded to the "Best and Fairest" AFL Player of the year. It is selected by a 3-2-1 voting system awarded by the umpires of each match for the whole year (excluding finals and pre-season). The winner of the 2006 Brownlow Medal was Adam Goodes, the Sydney Swans utility who was playing in the grand final later that week.

Grand final parade
The grand final parade took place on Friday 29 September 2006 and commenced on St Kilda Road, and ending at Spring Street. The crowd was officially estimated at fifty thousand people.

Teams

List

See also 
 2006 AFL finals series
 2006 AFL season

References

AFL Grand Final
VFL/AFL Grand Finals
Grand Final
West Coast Eagles
Sydney Swans